Anna McClellan is an American musician based in Omaha, Nebraska.

History
McClellan released her first full-length album in October 2015, titled Fire Flames, on Portland based label Majestic Litter. In February 2018, McClellan released her second full-length record titled Yes and No, after having signed to the record label Father/Daughter Records. In September 2020, McClellan announced plans to release her third full-length album. The album, titled I Saw First Light, was released on November 20, 2020.

Discography

Studio albums
Fire Flames (2015, Majestic Litter)
Yes and No (2018, Father/Daughter)
I Saw First Light (2020, Father/Daughter)

References

Living people
Year of birth missing (living people)